The Great Central Road is a mostly unsealed Australian outback highway that runs  from Laverton, Western Australia to Yulara, Northern Territory (near Uluru / Ayers Rock). It passes through a number of small communities on the way.

History
The Great Central Road has its origins in the early 1930s when Warburton was established as a missionary settlement, and supplies were delivered from Laverton via a rough bush track.

By the mid 1950s, the track from Laverton had become graded dirt. In 1958 during survey for the Gunbarrel Highway as part of the Woomera rocket range project, Len Beadell visited Warburton and built a new road from Giles via the Rawlinson Range to Warburton. Beadell returned to Giles via a different bush track which passed east through the Blackstone Range towards Docker River.

In January 1978 funds were provided to Warburton council by the Western Australian Government to construct a more direct road from Warburton to Docker River which bypassed part of the twenty-year-old Gunbarrel Highway. The Great Central Road and original Gunbarrel Highway are coincident for  near Giles.

Present conditions
Though still recommended only for four wheel drive vehicles, the road is now graded to a standard suitable for two wheel drive vehicles and caravans. It is on the most direct route from Perth to Uluru / Ayers Rock, with approximately 10,000 vehicles travelling the route annually.
 
When heading from the Northern Territory to Laverton there is an Amnesty Bin for Quarantine WA  outside of Laverton. All passenger vehicles are to stop and dispose of all quarantine risk material that is stated on the sign, including all fresh fruit, vegetables, honey, seed, potatoes, onions and other such plants. This area has a mobile inspector from time to time and there is risk of fines if travellers are stopped and offending material is found.

There are fuel supplies at the following locations along the route. The distances below are relative to Laverton.
 Cosmo Newbery – , 
 Tjukayirla Roadhouse – , 
 Warburton – ,  
 Warakurna Roadhouse – , 
 Docker River –  and 
 Yulara – .

It is recommended that communications equipment be carried while driving on this road. The route also passes directly into Aboriginal reserves and it is a legal requirement for travellers to hold a valid transit permit at the time of travel, even when staying on the Great Central Road. Two permits are required and they are available from the Department of Planning, Lands and Heritage of the Government of Western Australia and the Central Land Council in the Northern Territory. The permits are free.

Upgrades
The Northern Australia Roads Program announced in 2016 included the following project for the Great Central Road (Tjukaruru Road).

Sealing and upgrades
The project to seal and upgrade an unsealed section of the road is expected to be complete in late 2022 at a total cost of $10 million.

Gallery

Attractions
The two most notable attractions on this road are Kata Tjuta / The Olgas and Uluru / Ayers Rock, both within the Uluru-Kata Tjuta National Park in the Northern Territory.

On the Western Australian side of the border, other attractions include Tjukayirla Roadhouse, whose name derives from the Tjukayirla rockholes, which are located at the southwest end of the campground. Wildlife can be seen around the roadhouse, including dingoes, emus, kangaroos, camels and many species of birds.

Empress Springs, or Reti, is a significant cultural site for Ngalia people, and is situated on land subject to a native title claim. The site is depicted in a mural on Kalgoorlie Police Station, created by Deeva and Kado Muir in 2018. Access is via a chain ladder.

Nearby attractions include the marker erected by surveyors Harry L. Paine and Hugh C. Barclay in 1931 on their expedition to the Warburton Ranges, known as the Paine & Barclay Survey Marker. The closest rockhole to the marker is the Winduldarra Rockhole.
 
Additional attractions  include Lasseter's Cave, the Petermann Ranges, Giles Weather Station, the ochre bluff of Giles Breakaway, Lake Throssell, Lake Yeo Nature Reserve, and Peegull Waterhole and Caves.

Junctions

See also

 Hunt Oil Road
 Gibson Desert South

References

External links

Great Central Road on ExplorOz
Great Central Road (Tourism Western Australia)

Australian outback tracks
Goldfields-Esperance
Roads in the Northern Territory
Roads in Western Australia
Great Victoria Desert